A recreational vehicle, often abbreviated as RV, is a motor vehicle or trailer that includes living quarters designed for accommodation. Types of RVs include motorhomes, campervans, coaches, caravans (also known as travel trailers and camper trailers), fifth-wheel trailers, popup campers, and truck campers.

Features

Typical amenities of an RV include a kitchen, a bathroom, and one or more sleeping facilities. RVs can range from utilitarian – containing only sleeping quarters and basic cooking facilities – to luxurious, with features like air conditioning (AC), water heaters, televisions and satellite receivers, and quartz countertops, for example.

RVs can either be trailers (which are towed behind motor vehicles) or self-propelled vehicles. Most RVs are single-deck; however, double-deck RVs also exist. To allow a more compact size while in transit, larger RVs often have expandable sides (called slide-outs) or canopies that are deployed when stationary.

History

The first recreational vehicles were horse-drawn. They evolved during the second half of the nineteenth century as adaptations of vehicles used for other purposes, including public transport caravans (UK, also known as stage wagons), gypsy vardos (Europe), living vans (UK), ambulance wagons (US) and sheep herders wagons (US).

The first, currently-known, purpose-built RV was the horse-drawn Wanderer (UK), commissioned from the Bristol Wagon Works Company by Dr. Gordon Stables in 1884. Stables was a pioneer of the UK's Gentlemen Gypsy movement (1885–1914) which promoted the restorative benefits of horse-drawn leisure caravanning and inspired the formation of the world's first RV club, The Caravan Club (UK), in 1907. The Wanderer was closely followed by the McMaster Camping Car (US,1889).Camping-vehicle In the 1890s, US RV pioneers self-built timber 'houses on wheels' for health, leisure and hunting purposes. The most widely reported of these were those of Morgan Lasley and his family.  Horse-drawn RV use declined after the First World War as many horses were killed during the war and automobiles became cheaper, more powerful and more widely available.

The first powered RVs were steam-drawn trailers from France including the Grande Diligence of Prince Oldenburg (1896) and the De Dion Bouton trailer of Monsieur Rénodier (1898). The first steam-driven motorhome was the Quo Vadis (France,1900) and the first gasoline-driven motorhome was the Passe Partout (France, 1902). The first recorded powered motorhomes in America were the 'camp cars' of Roy Faye and Freeman Young of 1904–06 (a 1904 Rambler, 1905 Thomas Flyer and 1906 Matheson).  Lightweight tent trailers were especially popular in the US from 1911, thanks to improved roads, new national parks and the affordability of tow vehicles such as the Ford Model T.  At the other end of the price scale, luxury touring limousines, developed in France by De Dietrich in 1904, were built in small numbers in the US by Welch (1909)  and Pierce Arrow (1910). The first US RV club, the Tin Can Tourists, was formed in 1919. The first known, recreational fifth wheeler was the Auto Salon Deluxe built in Belgium for Baron Crawhez by Auto-Mixte Pescatore in 1913.

In the early twentieth century RV builders in the UK (Navarac, Piggott Bros, Eccles, Bertram Hutchings), the US (Detroit Trailer Company, Welch, Graham Brothers, Pierce-Arrow) and France (De Dietrich, Cadel) experimented with a wide range of RV types including caravans and trailers, motorhomes, touring limousines, tent trailers and fifth wheelers. Early motorhomes ('house cars' in the US) were usually converted goods trucks and were heavy, noisy, inflexible and expensive, restricting their use to the wealthy or self-builders. The 'one box' RV was not seen in large numbers until the small, lightweight Volkswagen Kombi of 1950. During the 1920s and 1930s, caravans (travel trailers) became the dominant form of RV in the UK due to their low cost, weather-resistance and flexibility. There was likewise a travel trailer boom in the US in the 1930s as automobile production-line manufacturing techniques were used in travel trailer manufacturing to meet growing demand from recreational users and those seeking low-cost housing during The Great Depression. Self-built trailers were highly popular in the US during the 1930s and travel trailers featured in a number of Hollywood movies including Mickey's Trailer (1938).

The 1920s and 1930s, saw some influential, maverick builders construct innovative RVs in small numbers. These included Bertram Hutchings (UK, 1930–39, streamlined caravans), Charles Louvet (France, 1924–34, aircraft-inspired, coach-built motorhomes and trailers), Noel Pemberton Billing (UK, 1927, Road Yacht motorhome), Glenn Curtiss (US, 1918–30, Adams Motorbungalo, Curtiss Aerocar, Aero Coupler hitch) and William Hawley Bowlus (US, 1934, aluminum monocoque trailers). Wally Byam's Airstream (US, 1931 onwards) was a successful trailer builder of the period and is the only survivor of over 400 pre-WW2 US RV manufacturers.

Prior to WW2 a number of other countries developed their own small-scale RV manufacturing industries including Germany, Australia, New Zealand and the Netherlands. Germany had a particular focus on small, lightweight caravans towable by low-cost automobiles  whilst Australia developed 'pop-top' caravans with good ventilation, ample water storage and high ground clearance.  During WW2 RV production was halted in most countries except when required as accommodation for military personnel or essential workers. 

Between 1945 and 1960, RVs flourished in many western countries as disposable income and leisure time grew. Dedicated RV parks were established to cater to the needs of both short and long-term RV users. Improvements in RV technology including batteries, fridges, gas cookers, toilets and lightweight construction techniques dramatically improved RV comfort levels. More powerful gasoline and diesel engines allowed RVs to increase in size, weight and speed. Regulations were introduced in many countries to control how RVs were manufactured and used.

Taking an RV on vacation is today one of the most popular leisure activities in Europe, the US and Australasia and increasing in popularity in countries where space and facilities permit.

Industry 
In the United States, about 85 percent of recreational vehicles sold are manufactured in Indiana, and roughly two-thirds of that production in Elkhart County, which calls itself "the RV Capital of the World", population 206,000. The industry has US$32.4 billion annual economic impact in Indiana, pays US$3.1 billion in taxes to the state and supports 126,140 jobs and US$7.8 billion in wages, according to the RV Industry Association.

The recreational vehicle industry around Elkhart is part of a large network of related transport equipment companies, including utility trailer makers and specialty bus manufacturers, who source from the same supply chains. The industry has taken hits from US tariffs on steel and aluminum and other duties on RV parts made in China, from plumbing fixtures to electronic components to vinyl seat covers. Tariff-related price hikes forced manufacturers to pass on some of the increased costs through higher RV prices, which in turn has contributed to slower sales. Shipments of RVs to dealers fell 22% percent in the first five months of 2019, compared to the same period a year earlier, after dropping 4% in 2018.

Some trailer companies are using innovative materials in new ways to make trailers lighter, more durable and more cost efficient. Cortes Campers LLC has filed for multiple new patents and have improved manufacturing techniques to address issues such as frequent repairs, supply chain issues, mold, mildew and catastrophic failures of key components of travel trailers. The new double hulled completely redesigned travel trailer is made of fiberglass and built much in the way airplanes and boats are built

Usage 

RVs are most commonly used for living quarters while traveling. People may choose to take a road trip in their RV and use the RV to sleep in, rather than a hotel room. They may even decide to tow their car from the back of the RV so they can use that to travel around more easily when they reach their destination.

Although the most common usage of an RV is as temporary accommodation when traveling, some people use an RV as their main residence. In fact, one million Americans live in RVs. In the United States and Canada, traveling south each winter to a warmer climate is referred to as snowbirding. In Australia, the slang term for a retired person who travels in a recreational vehicle is a "grey nomad".

While it is legal in all of the United States to live in an RV, there are laws regarding where and for how long RVs can be parked.

Some owners fit solar panels to the roof of their RV. It is possible for RV user to live off the electrical grid while still having access to internet making remote working feasible. 

Usage of RVs is common at rural festivals such as Burning Man.

Demographics

United States
As of 2016, the average age of RV owners in the United States was 45, a three-year decrease since 2015. Per 2020 research reports, more millennials are interested in buying RVs due to their increased demand for camping and outdoor recreational activities, especially in the US.

Due to the COVID-19 pandemic, sales of RVs in the United States have increased, and as of March 2021, 11.3 million households own an RV, which is a 26 percent increase over the past ten years. In the month of October 2021, 58,000 RVs were manufactured in North America, the most ever in a single month.

Current Trends 

 Wholesale recreational vehicle (RV) shipments during the first four months of 2021 rose more than 86% over 2020, because consumer demand for RVs has soared since the pandemic’s onset.
 Analysts expect industry revenue to increase 1.1% through 2026 as U.S. residents continue to plan domestic trips because of continued travel restrictions around the globe.

See also

 Alternative housing
 Fulltiming
 Housetrucker
 Motorhome
 List of recreational vehicle manufacturers
 List of recreational vehicles
 Recreational vehicle terms
 Rest area
 RV park
 Tiny-house movement
 Vardo (Romani wagon)
 Van-dwelling

References

Further reading

External links 
 

 
Articles containing video clips
Camping
Land vehicles with sleeping facilities

chy:Hóxovéstavestôtse